The 2014 Scottish Women's Premier League was the thirteenth season of the Scottish Women's Premier League, the highest division of women's football in Scotland since its inception in 2002. The competition started on 16 March 2014.

A total of twelve teams contested the league. Glasgow City were the reigning champions.

Queen's Park and Inverness City were promoted from the SWFL First Division after finishing 1st and 3rd respectively, with Queen's Park appearing in the Premier League for the first time. Celtic Reserves who finished as First Division runners-up, were unable to be promoted as league rules stipulate each club may field only one team in the Premier League.

The SWPL continued in the format applied since 2012. The 12 clubs faced each other once (11 games per club), after which the league split into top six and bottom six sections based on league position. Each club then played home and away against clubs in their respective sections to give a total of 21 games.

Glasgow City confirmed their eighth consecutive championship title on 1 October 2014. City suffered their first league defeat since 2012, when they lost 1–0 to Spartans in September 2014.

Teams

Stadia and locations

The most regular home ground is shown though some clubs played matches at other venues throughout the season.

League standings

Results

Matches 1–11
Clubs play each other once.

Matches 12–21
After 11 matches, the league splits into top six and bottom six sections. Clubs played every other club in their section twice (home and away).

Top six

Bottom six

References

External links
Season on soccerway.com

1
Scot
Scot
Scottish Women's Premier League seasons